Connecticut's 145th House district is one of 151 Connecticut House of Representatives districts. It is represented by Corey Paris of Stamford. Prior to the redistricting of 1972, the 145th district was in Norwalk.

List of representatives

Recent Elections

2022

2021 Special

2020

See also 
 List of members of the Connecticut General Assembly from Norwalk

References

External links 
 Google Maps - Connecticut House Districts

145
145th